Kinyongia mulyai is a species of chameleons first described in 2015, endemic to the Nzawa forest regions of the south-eastern Democratic Republic of the Congo.

Description 
Kinyongia mulyai has an olive green head with light brown eyeballs, intersected by two thin horizontal stripes running through it. A small triangular area between the mouth line, nares and orbital rim is blue-green coloured. The throat region is pale orange and yellow, extending between the front limbs. Its body is predominantly olive green coloured with light green tubercles on the outside limbs.

Distribution 
The species is only known to occupy small, highly fragmented remnant of Afrotemperate forest on Mount Nzawa. It is found perching on vines ranging from a few meters high to up to 20 meters high. Recent satellite imagery show only 3 remaining suitable patches of habitable forest area.

Etymology 
The species is named for Jules Mulya, who was an assistant on the March 2010 expedition that lead to its discovery.

Conservation 
The species has been listed as CITES II/B and is labelled Critically Endangered by the IUCN. EU Wildlife Trade Regulations list the species as annex B.

References

Kinyongia
Reptiles described in 2015
Taxa named by Colin R. Tilbury
Taxa named by Krystal A. Tolley
Reptiles of the Democratic Republic of the Congo
Endemic fauna of the Democratic Republic of the Congo